Fetish Con is an annual trade show focusing on networking within the adult entertainment industry. Other additional events include lectures for the general public. Retail sales of adult clothing and toys is also an attraction that draws people. The idea of holding such an event came to Genesis Lynn, Vesta and Mike when they started sharing shoots with each other in 2000. These three became the founder of this event. 

As the name alludes, Fetish Con's main demographic is people who practice fetishism and BDSM or are interested in them. The event was first held in 2001 and it has been produced by XIX Events since its first inception. Three years after its first event, Fetish Con moved to Tampa, Florida in 2004 and later in 2015 to St. Petersburg, Florida.

Dates and locations

References

External links 
 

2001 establishments in the United States
Erotic events
Recurring events established in 2001
Sexuality in Florida
Trade shows in the United States
Events in St. Petersburg, Florida